Isles of Scilly Skybus is a British airline which operates year-round scheduled services to the Isles of Scilly from Land's End Airport and Newquay Airport in Cornwall, and seasonal scheduled services from Exeter. Their head office is located in the Isles of Scilly Travel Centre in Penzance, Cornwall.

Isles of Scilly Skybus Limited holds a United Kingdom Civil Aviation Authority Type B Operating Licence; it is permitted to carry passengers, cargo and mail on aircraft with fewer than 20 seats and/or weighing less than 10 tonnes.

The airline is owned by the Isles of Scilly Steamship Company. The parent company operates shipping services to the Isles of Scilly in its own name, and also owned the now defunct Westward Airways.

History 
The airline was established in March 1984 and started operations in August 1984. Isles of Scilly Skybus originated as an air charter operator at Land's End aerodrome which operated high frequency services to the Isles of Scilly. Following the withdrawal of Brymon Airways routes to and from the islands the operator stepped in, initially operating services to Plymouth. This route was later dropped but with the addition of Twin Otter aircraft the route network expanded to its current make-up. It is wholly owned by the Isles of Scilly Steamship Company which also runs the passenger ferry, Scillonian III, and freight services from Penzance to the Islands. Skybus celebrated 25 years of service in June 2009, painting the aircraft tails with the 25 years mark. An extra Twin Otter aircraft was sourced for the beginning of the 2013 season following the cessation of helicopter services to and from the islands. Flights to Bristol Airport and Southampton Airport were dropped at the end of the 2012 season to concentrate on services from Exeter, Newquay and Land's End.

Destinations 

Aircraft are based at Land's End Airport, Newquay Cornwall Airport and St. Mary's Airport.

Historically, Skybus have flown to Bristol Airport, Southampton Airport, Cardiff Airport in the UK, Saint-Brieuc - Armor Airport in France and the now defunct Plymouth Airport.

Fleet 

The Isles of Scilly Skybus fleet includes the following aircraft:

References

External links

Official website

Airlines of the United Kingdom
Airlines established in 1984
Transport in Cornwall
Transport in the Isles of Scilly
Companies based in Cornwall
British companies established in 1984